The 1947 Star World Championship was held in Los Angeles, United States in 1947.

Results

References

Star World Championships
1947 in sailing
Star World
Star World Championships in the United States
1947 in American sports